The 2021 Bank of America Roval 400 was a NASCAR Cup Series race held on October 10, 2021, at Charlotte Motor Speedway in Concord, North Carolina. Contested over 109 laps on the  road course, it was the 32nd race of the 2021 NASCAR Cup Series season, the sixth race of the Playoffs, and final race of the Round of 12.

Report

Background

Since 2018, deviating from past NASCAR events at Charlotte, the race will utilize a road course configuration of Charlotte Motor Speedway, promoted and trademarked as the "Roval". The race will be contested over a scheduled distance of 109 laps, .

During July 2018 tests on the road course, concerns were raised over drivers "cheating" the backstretch chicane on the course. The chicanes were modified with additional tire barriers and rumble strips in order to encourage drivers to properly drive through them, and NASCAR will enforce drive-through penalties on drivers who illegally "short-cut" parts of the course. The chicanes will not be used during restarts.  In the summer of 2019, the bus stop on the backstretch was changed and deepened, becoming a permanent part of the circuit, compared to the previous year where it was improvised.

If a driver fails to legally make the backstretch bus stop, the driver must skip the frontstretch chicane and make a complete stop by the dotted line on the exit before being allowed to continue.  A driver who misses the frontstretch chicane must stop before the exit.

On October 9, 2021, NASCAR removed six sets of six yellow and black rumble strips from the layout after Josh Bilicki's No. 07 car suffered catastrophic front end damage from one set of strips during the Xfinity race earlier that day.

Entry list
 (R) denotes rookie driver.
 (i) denotes driver who are ineligible for series driver points.

Qualifying
Denny Hamlin was awarded the pole for the race as determined by competition-based formula.

Starting Lineup

Race

Denny Hamlin was the pole sitter for the race. Chase Elliot won Stage 1 and Kyle Busch won Stage 2. Despite dealing with technical issues during the race, Kyle Larson was able to overcome it to pass Hamlin with 8 laps to go to win the race. The victory made Larson the first Cup driver in NASCAR history to win three different road courses in a single season (Sonoma, Watkins Glen and the Charlotte Roval). William Byron, Alex Bowman, Christopher Bell and Kevin Harvick were eliminated from the playoffs.

Stage Results

Stage One
Laps: 25

Stage Two
Laps: 25

Final Stage Results

Stage Three
Laps: 59

Race statistics
 Lead changes: 15 among 10 different drivers
 Cautions/Laps: 9 for 18
 Red flags: 0
 Time of race: 3 hours, 15 minutes and 4 seconds
 Average speed:

Media

Television
NBC Sports covered the race on the television side. Rick Allen, Jeff Burton, Steve Letarte and Dale Earnhardt Jr. called the race from the broadcast booth. Dave Burns, Parker Kligerman and Marty Snider handled the pit road duties from pit lane. Rutledge Wood handled the features from the track.

Radio
The Performance Racing Network had the radio call for the race, which was also simulcasted on Sirius XM NASCAR Radio. Doug Rice and Mark Garrow called the race from the booth when the field raced down the front straightaway. IMS Radio's Nick Yeoman was assigned the entrance to the road course and into the Bank of America bridge (Turns 1-3). Voice of the Indianapolis 500 Mark Jaynes was assigned the action from the Bank of America bridge to the middle of the infield section. Doug Turnbull called the action exiting in infield into the oval Turn 1 banking (Turns 7-9).  Pat Patterson called the action on the backstretch and into the bus stop.  Rob Albright was assigned to the oval Turn 3-4 end. (Turns 13-15). Brad Gillie, Brett McMillan and Wendy Venturini had the call from the pit area for PRN.

Standings after the race

Drivers' Championship standings

Manufacturers' Championship standings

Note: Only the first 16 positions are included for the driver standings.

References

Bank of America Roval 400
Bank of America Roval 400
NASCAR races at Charlotte Motor Speedway
Bank of America Roval 400